Joan Chamorro (born in 1962) is a Spanish jazz musician and music teacher. He plays saxophone, clarinet, flute, cornet, and double bass. He is the founder and director of the Sant Andreu Jazz Band. He developed his own teaching method. In 2012, he received the Premis Altaveu award.

Biography 
Joan Chamorro studied saxophone at the Municipal Conservatory of Barcelona under Adolf Ventas. He also graduated the music school Taller de Músics in Barcelona.

He has played with Slide Hampton, Tete Montoliu, Frank Foster, Teddy Edwards, Frank Wess, Bebo Valdés, Randy Brecker, Gary Smulyan, Dick Oatts, Jessie Davis, Dennis Rowland, Carmen Lundy, John Mosca, David Allen, Bobby Shew, and Judy Niemack. He was part of the Big Band del Taller de músics, the Big Band de Bellaterra, John Dubuclet's Big Band, the Big Band Jazz Terrassa, and Eladio Reinón-Tete Montoliu's Supercombo.

In 2006, Chamorro founded the Sant Andreu Jazz Band, where he teaches young musicians (7–21-years-old). He is the producer of the Joan Chamorro Presenta collection featuring some of the members of the Sant Andreu Jazz Band, for example Andrea Motis, Alba Armengou, Eva Férnandez, Rita Payés, Magalí Datzira and Èlia Bastida. The album  Joan Chamorro Presenta La Màgia De La Veu received the Enderrock Award 2015 for the best album and the album Joan Chamorro Presenta Rita Payés received the Enderrock Award 2015 for best new jazz project. In 2013, Ramón Tort made a documentary film A Film about Kids and Music that is a portrait of Joan Chamorro and his music project, the Sant Andreu Jazz Band.

Chamorro also leads the Andrea Motis  & Joan Chamorro Quintet.

Discography 
 2008: Joan Chamorro Barytone Rhapsody (Frech Sound Records)
 2010: Joan Chamorro presenta Andrea Motis (Temps Record, DiscMedi Blau)
 2012: Joan Chamorro & Andrea Motis Feeling Good (Temps Record)
 2013: Joan Chamorro presenta Eva Fernández (Temps Record)
 2013: Andrea Motis & Joan Chamorro Quintet Featuring Scott Hamilton Live at Jamboree Barcelona (Swift Records)
 2014: Coses que es diuen però que no es fan NewCat Andrea Motis Joan Chamorro
 2014: Live At Casa Fuster (Jazz To Jazz)
 2014: Joan Chamorro presenta Magalí Datzira (Jazz To Jazz)
 2015: Joan Chamorro presenta La Màgia De La Veu (Jazz To Jazz)
 2015: Joan Chamorro presenta Rita Payés (Jazz to Jazz)
 2015: Live At Palau De La - Andrea Motis & Joan Chamorro amb l´orquestra simfònica del Vallès (Jazz To Jazz)
 2015: Joan Chamorro presenta Marc Martin (Jazz To Jazz)
 2015: Live - MotisChamorro Big Band (Jazz To Jazz)
 2015: Miles Tribut Big Band - Sketces of Catalonia dir. Joan Chamorro
 2016: Joan Chamorro presenta La Màgica De La Veu & Jazz Ensemble (Jazz To Jazz)
 2016: Joan Chamorro presenta Joan Mar Sauqué (Jazz To Jazz)
 2016: Lua Amarela by Joan Chamorro & Rita Payès (Jazz To Jazz)
 2016: Joan Chamorro nonet & more play Alfons Carrascosa´s arrangements
 2017: Joan Chamorro presenta Èlia Bastida (Jazz To Jazz)
 2017: Joan Chamorro octet play Luigi Grasso´s arrangements 
 2018: Joan Chamorro presenta Joan Codina (Jazz To Jazz)
 2019: Joan Chamorro presenta Alba Armengou (Jazz To Jazz)
 2019: Joan Chamorro presenta Carla Motis (Jazz To Jazz)
 2019: The Magic Sound of The Violin Elia Bastida & Joan Chamorro Quartet feat. Scott Hamilton
 2020: Joan Chamorro presenta Jan Domènech (Jazz To Jazz)
 2020: Joan Chamorro presenta Joana Casanova (Jazz To Jazz)
 2020: Joan Chamorro new quartet & Scott Hamilton (Jazz To Jazz)
 2020: Joan Chamorro plays Fredrik Carlquist´s arrangements
 2021: Joan Chamorro presenta Joan Marti (Jazz To Jazz)
 2021: Joan Chamorro presenta Marcal Perramon (Jazz To Jazz)
 2021: Èlia Bastida meet Scott Hamilton & Joan Chamorro Trio
 2022: Joan Chamorro & Friends Remembering Toni Belenguer (Jazz To Jazz)
 2022: Joan Chamorro presenta Alba Esteban (Jazz To Jazz)
 2022: Joan Chamorro Presenta's Big-Band

References

External links 

 
 Garry Berman: Series of articles about Joan Chamorro's work Medium (website)
 Joan-Chamorro discography at Discogs

1962 births
Living people
Musicians from Barcelona
Jazz educators
Jazz double-bassists
Spanish jazz saxophonists